"The Fletcher Memorial Home" is a song by Roger Waters, performed by Pink Floyd. The song appears on their 1983 album, The Final Cut. It is the eighth track on the album and is arranged between "Get Your Filthy Hands Off My Desert" and "Southampton Dock". The song is also featured on the Pink Floyd compilations Echoes: The Best of Pink Floyd and A Foot in the Door – The Best of Pink Floyd.

History
The song is about Waters' frustration with the leadership of the world since World War II, mentioning many world leaders by name (Ronald Reagan, Alexander Haig, Menachem Begin, Margaret Thatcher, Ian Paisley, Leonid Brezhnev, Joseph McCarthy and Richard Nixon), suggesting that these "colonial wasters of life and limb" be segregated into a specially-founded retirement home.  It labels all the world leaders as "overgrown infants" and "incurable tyrants" and suggests they are incapable of understanding anything other than violence or their own faces on a television screen.

In its concluding lines, the narrator of the song gathers all of the "tyrants" inside the Fletcher Memorial Home and imagines applying "the Final Solution" to them.

Fletcher in the name of the song is in honour and remembrance of Roger Waters' father, Eric Fletcher Waters, who was killed during the Second World War at Anzio.

The Fletcher Memorial Home scenes in The Final Cut film were filmed at Forty Hall in Enfield.

Reception
In a review for The Final Cut, Patrick Schabe of PopMatters described "The Fletcher Memorial Home" as "majestic, but clunky".

Personnel
 Roger Waters – vocals, bass guitar
 David Gilmour – guitar
 Nick Mason – drums

with:

 The National Philharmonic Orchestra conducted and arranged by Michael Kamen 
 Michael Kamen – piano

See also
Ronald Reagan in music

References

1983 songs
Pink Floyd songs
Anti-war songs
Protest songs
Songs written by Roger Waters
Song recordings produced by Roger Waters
Songs about politicians
British hard rock songs

he:The Fletcher Memorial Home